Incestophantes is a genus of  dwarf spiders that was first described by A. V. Tanasevitch in 1992.

Species
 it contains twenty-three species, found in Canada, China, Finland, Georgia, Kazakhstan, Mongolia, Norway, Russia, Sweden, Ukraine, and the United States:
Incestophantes altaicus Tanasevitch, 2000 – Russia (South Siberia)
Incestophantes amotus (Tanasevitch, 1990) – Russia (Caucasus to Central Asia), Georgia, Kazakhstan
Incestophantes ancus Tanasevitch, 1996 – Russia (South Siberia)
Incestophantes annulatus (Kulczyński, 1882) – Central and Eastern Europe
Incestophantes bonus Tanasevitch, 1996 – Russia (South Siberia)
Incestophantes brevilamellus Tanasevitch, 2013 – Russia (South Siberia)
Incestophantes camtchadalicus (Tanasevitch, 1988) – Russia (Kamchatka)
Incestophantes crucifer (Menge, 1866) – Europe, Russia (Europe to West Siberia)
Incestophantes cymbialis (Tanasevitch, 1988) – Russia (Far East, East Siberia)
Incestophantes duplicatus (Emerton, 1913) – USA, Canada
Incestophantes frigidus (Simon, 1884) – Europe (Alps)
Incestophantes incestoides (Tanasevitch & Eskov, 1987) – Russia (Urals to Far East/East Siberia)
Incestophantes incestus (L. Koch, 1879) (type) – Russia (Urals to Central/South Siberia), Mongolia
Incestophantes khakassicus Tanasevitch, 1996 – Russia (South Siberia)
Incestophantes kochiellus (Strand, 1900) – Norway, Sweden, Finland, Russia (Europe to East Siberia/Far East), China
Incestophantes kotulai (Kulczyński, 1905) – Europe (Alps)
Incestophantes lamprus (Chamberlin, 1920) – USA, Canada
Incestophantes laricetorum (Tanasevitch & Eskov, 1987) – Russia (Europe to East Siberia/Far East)
Incestophantes logunovi Tanasevitch, 1996 – Russia (South Siberia)
Incestophantes mercedes (Chamberlin & Ivie, 1943) – USA
Incestophantes shetekaurii Otto & Tanasevitch, 2015 – Georgia
Incestophantes tuvensis Tanasevitch, 1996 – Russia (South Siberia)
Incestophantes washingtoni (Zorsch, 1937) – USA, Canada

See also
 List of Linyphiidae species (I–P)

References

Araneomorphae genera
Linyphiidae
Spiders of Asia
Spiders of North America